Hotel Insomnia is the fifth and final studio album by Japanese shoegaze band For Tracy Hyde, released on December 14, 2022, through P-Vine Records.

Themes 
The album was inspired by the unease and anxiety of living in a post-COVID world. The band cites shibuya-kei as a major influence on the album's sound.

Release 
The album was released on December 14, 2022. It was preceded by the singles "Subway Station Revelation" and "Milkshake".  Milkshake was released as part of a split single with Thai shoegaze band Death of Heather. A tour was announced for the album, featuring three dates around Tokyo and Osaka, and a co-headline with Lovely Summer Chan. On January 5, 2023, it was announced that the band would break up on March 25, after the final show of the tour.

Reception 
Pitchfork featured the album on their "6 New Albums You Should Listen to Now" list. Joshua Kim of NPR praised the song "Undulate", saying that it "feels like we're being launched into space, leaving the stratosphere to find a new home among the stars."

Track listing

Chart positions

References 

P-Vine Records albums
2022 albums
Japanese-language albums